HMS Abdiel was an  that served with the Royal Navy during World War II. She served with the Mediterranean Fleet (1941), Eastern Fleet (1942), Home Fleet (1942–43), and the Mediterranean Fleet (1943). Abdiel was sunk by German mines in Italy's Taranto harbour in 1943. Although designed as a fast minelayer her speed and capacity made her suitable for employment as a fast transport.

Service

Channel
On 22 March 1941, Abdiel (Captain Hon. Edward Pleydell-Bouverie) had acceptance trials interrupted and was ordered to lay mines with the objective of preventing the German battleships  and  breaking out from Brest.

This group was then transferred from Plymouth to Gibraltar, having loaded military stores destined for Malta. The ships subsequently joined the Mediterranean Fleet.

Mediterranean
On 24 to 28 April 1941 they formed part of "Operation Dunlop".

On 21 May 1941 Abdiel laid a field of 150 mines off Akra Dhoukaton (Cape Dukato, southern tip of Lefkada island, Ionian sea). On the field were later the same day lost the Italian destroyer  (1,840 tons), the gunboat Pellegrino Matteucci and the German transports Kybfels (7764 GRT) and Marburg (7564 GRT) which were transporting a large contingent of the 2nd Panzer Division from Patras in Greece across the Adriatic Sea to the port of Taranto in Italy.

On the night of 26–27 May, Abdiel, escorted by the destroyer  and the Australian destroyer , landed 800 Commandos at Suda Bay.

On 31 May 1941, Abdiel sailed from Alexandria for Sfakia, Crete with the light cruiser  and three destroyers. During the following night these ships removed 4,000 troops from Crete.

Between December 1942 and April 1943 Abdiel, in cooperation with the minelaying submarine  and Abdiels sister ship , laid several minefields with about 2,000 mines in the Strait of Sicily.

On 9 January 1943, after Abdiel laid a minefield across the Axis evacuation route from Tunisia, the escort of an Italian convoy ran into it and the destroyer  (1,645 tons) was sunk, while the destroyer  (1,440 tons) was severely damaged. On 3 February 1943 another Italian convoy's escort fouled another of her minefields south of Marettimo island, off the western tip of Sicily, losing the destroyer  (1,225 tons) and the torpedo boat  (910 tons).

On 3 April 1943 Abdiel laid a minefield between the Italian fields X-2 and X-3, whose location was known to the Allies through Ultra intercepts and captured documents.

Sinking
Abdiel, was sunk by mines in Taranto harbour, Italy on 10 September 1943, during Operation Slapstick. The mines had been laid just a few hours earlier by two German torpedo boats (S-54 and S-61), as they left the harbour. Abdiel, carrying troops of the British 1st Airborne Division (6th (Royal Welch) Parachute Battalion and 204 (Oban) Anti-Tank Battery, Royal Artillery), took the berth which had been declined earlier by the captain of the US cruiser . Shortly after midnight, two mines detonated beneath Abdiel and the minelayer sank in three minutes, with great loss of life among both sailors and soldiers. The 1st Airborne Division lost 58 dead and around 150 injured, the Derbyshire Yeomanry lost 1 member of Popskis private army Lt.McGillavray and 48 crew were lost. There is a rumour that the ship's degaussing equipment had been turned off to reduce noise and to allow troops to sleep better. Commander F Ashe Lincoln QC RNVR gives a different cause in his book "Secret Naval Investigator" (Wm Kimber London 1961, and pp132–3 of the 2017 reprint). A naval mine clearance expert, he found in the Germans' Taranto magazine a number of large wooden wheels fitted with depth charges, with a timing clock and explosive charge in the centre. He says that one of these devices had been sunk next to the mooring buoy Abdiel used when the Germans evacuated the previous night.

References

Bibliography
 
 
Warlow, Ben, Lt. Cdr., Royal Navy (2004) Battle Honours of the Royal Navy, Maritime Books: Liskeard, UK

External links
 

 

Abdiel-class minelayers
Ships built on the Isle of Wight
1940 ships
World War II minelayers of the United Kingdom
Ships sunk by mines
Maritime incidents in September 1943
World War II shipwrecks in the Mediterranean Sea